Purpureum, purple in Latin, may refer to:

 Chlorogalum purpureum, the purple amole, a flowering plant species endemic to California
 Chondrostereum purpureum, the silver leaf, a fungus plant pathogen species
 Eutrochium purpureum, a herbaceous perennial plant in the sunflower family native to eastern and central North America
 Lamium purpureum, the red deadnettle, purple deadnettle or purple archangel, a herbaceous flowering plant species native to Europe and Asia
 Lasiopetalum purpureum, a synonym for Thomasia purpurea, a shrub species found in Australia
 Pennisetum purpureum, a species of perennial tropical grass native to the African grasslands
 Syzygium purpureum, a species of plant in the family Myrtaceae endemic to Fiji

See also 
 Purpurea (disambiguation)
 Purpura (disambiguation)